Haast is a German family name.  It may refer to:

 High Availability for Asterisk, a software package which turns any two Asterisk servers into a cluster
 Bill Haast (1910–2011), founder of the Miami Serpentarium and pioneering snake venom collector
 Julius von Haast (1822–1887), German geologist and explorer of New Zealand; several things in New Zealand are named for him:
 Haast's eagle, extinct species of giant eagle identified by Haast and eventually named for him
 Haast, New Zealand, township on the Tasman Sea
 Haast Aerodrome, aerodrome adjacent Haast in New Zealand
 Haast Pass, a mountain pass in the Southern Alps
 Haast River, a river on the West Coast of the South Island
 Haast Schist, kind of rock found in New Zealand
 Anne Haast (born 1993), Dutch chess player
 Cees Haast (1938–2019), Dutch cyclist